Vera Cruz is an unincorporated community in Brown County, in the U.S. state of Ohio.

It is the location of the McCafferty Road Covered Bridge.

History
A post office was established at Vera Cruz in 1872, and remained in operation until 1905. The community was named in commemoration of the Siege of Veracruz in the Mexican–American War.

References

Unincorporated communities in Brown County, Ohio
1872 establishments in Ohio
Unincorporated communities in Ohio